Aeonium lancerottense is a species of succulent flowering plant in the family Crassulaceae that is endemic to the island of  Lanzarote in the Canary islands.

References

lancerottense